Adair–Austin Stadium  is a sport stadium on the campus of Friends University in Wichita, Kansas. The facility is primarily used by the Friends University Falcons football, soccer, and track and field teams. The stadium is also used for other community events.

References

External links
Friends University Athletic Facilities

College football venues
Sports venues in Kansas
Buildings and structures in Wichita, Kansas
Friends Falcons football
American football venues in Kansas